The 21st Cartoon Art Trust Awards, hosted by the Cartoon Art Trust, owners and operators of the Cartoon Museum, were held on 12 October 2017 at the Mall Galleries in London, honouring the best cartoons of 2017. The award ceremony was hosted by cartoonist and museum chairman Oliver Preston.

Winners
 British Cartoonists' Association Young Cartoonist of the Year Award – Under 18 Category: Billy Barron 
 British Cartoonists' Association Young Cartoonist of the Year Award – Under 30 Category: Ella Baron 
 CAT Award for Joke Cartooning: Adam Singleton 
 CAT Award for Strip Cartooning: Alexander Williams
 CAT Award for Caricature: Ben Jennings 
 CAT Award for Political Cartooning: Bob Moran
 The Pont Cup for drawing The British Character: Sally Artz
 The Heneage Cup: The Cartoon Art Trust Lifetime Achievement Award" Peter Brookes

See also
 Cartoon Art Trust Awards
 Cartoon Museum

References
 The Times, p57, 26 October 2017
 Daily Telegraph 14 October 2017

Notes

External links
 Cartoon Museum Official site Retrieved 29 January 2020

2017 in London
October 2017 events in the United Kingdom
Annual events in the United Kingdom